Eunidia jeanneli is a species of beetle in the family Cerambycidae. It was described by Breuning in 1939. It is known from Tanzania, Somalia, Kenya, Zimbabwe, and South Africa.

It's 4½–7 mm long and 1–1⅔ mm wide, and its type locality is Neu-Moschi, in the Kilimanjaro Region of Tanzania. It was named in honor of the French entomologist René Jeannel.

References

Eunidiini
Beetles described in 1939
Taxa named by Stephan von Breuning (entomologist)